Human Target is an American action drama television series that was broadcast by Fox in the United States. Based loosely on the Human Target comic book character created by Len Wein and Carmine Infantino for DC Comics, it is the second series based on this title developed for television, the first TV series having been aired in 1992 on ABC. Developed by Jonathan E. Steinberg, Human Target premiered on CTV in Canada and on Fox in the United States in January 2010.

The series stars Mark Valley, Chi McBride, Jackie Earle Haley, with Indira Varma and Janet Montgomery joining the cast in the second season. It follows Christopher Chance (Valley)–an ex-assassin–who is a private contractor that serves as a bodyguard and provides security for his clients. It was renewed for a second season in May 2010, with new showrunner Matt Miller replacing Steinberg. The series received generally positive reviews, with critics praising its action sequences and its use of comedy. Fox canceled the series after two seasons in May 2011.

Synopsis 
The series follows the life of San Francisco-based Christopher Chance (Mark Valley), a unique private contractor, bodyguard and security expert hired to protect his clients. Rather than taking on the target's identity himself (as in the comic book version), he protects his clients by completely integrating himself into their lives, to become a "human target". Chance is accompanied by business partner Winston (Chi McBride) and hired gun Guerrero (Jackie Earle Haley). Former client Ilsa Pucci (Indira Varma) becomes Chance's benefactor, while experienced thief Ames (Janet Montgomery) joins the team to seek redemption. Chance puts himself on the line to find the truth behind the mission. Even his own business partner Winston does not know what drove him towards this life, although it is explained in the first-season finale episode (which also explains about the name Christopher Chance itself).

Cast and characters

Main 
 Mark Valley as Christopher Chance: An ex-assassin formerly employed by "The Old Man", who became a security specialist/private contractor/mercenary-for-hire helping those in need. He took the name from the previous Christopher Chance (Lee Majors). His real name is unknown. Abandoned as a child, Chance has a dark and mysterious past, beginning with his recruitment by "The Old Man" and training into one of the world's greatest assassins. Despite being given the Old Man's true name as his own (he is referred to as "Junior") and being selected to succeed him as leader of the organization, Chance instead broke ranks, fled, and taking up the name and mantle of Christopher Chance, started his life again. Officially, he is listed as "John Doe", with the name "Christopher Chance" amongst his many aliases.
 Chi McBride as Detective Laverne Winston:A former police inspector with the San Francisco Police Department who is now Chance's business partner. Winston left the force after the Katherine Walters mission "to do what was right. But no B.S.; no egos in the way." At the end of season one, he was in the custody of one of the Old Man's clients for secretly hiding a mysterious book they were after, with Chance and the Old Man working together again to get him back.
 Jackie Earle Haley as Guerrero: An ex-assassin formerly employed by the Old Man, who also went rogue alongside Chance after he was ordered to kill Katherine Walters when Chance refused to do it. Guerrero works as part of the team, and despite his complicated nature, cares greatly about Winston and Chance, considering the former a friend and secretly protecting the latter from the Old Man's agents. Outwardly, Guerrero appears weak and nerdy when in reality he is actually a highly intelligent, vicious, and deadly killer. Despite this, he is deeply loyal to his friends and a family man with a child of his own. He helps Chance and Winston in their missions by using his underworld contacts, as an accomplished computer hacker, and is also an expert in torturing people for information.
 Indira Varma as Ilsa Pucci:A sophisticated and recently widowed billionaire who becomes a benefactor to Chance to aid their protection agency.
 Janet Montgomery as Ames:A thief whose chameleon-like abilities allow her to blend into any situation. Winston, familiar with Ames from his days on the police force, offers her a job in an effort to help her get her life on the right track.

Recurring 
 Emmanuelle Vaugier as FBI Special Agent Emma Barnes: After her career was tarnished by Chance's activities in "Embassy Row", Chance is able to get her help to stop Baptiste's assassination mission in "Baptiste". With Baptiste's arrest, Barnes' reputation is implied to have been restored. Barnes and Chance have complicated romantic feelings for each other.
 Autumn Reeser as Layla:A computer technician who was initially working for a corrupt defense contractor company Sentronics in "Lockdown", but after it was ruined by Chance, Layla was recruited to freelance for the team in "Baptiste".
 Leonor Varela as Maria Gallego: Chance's former girlfriend who asks for his help in "Salvage & Reclamation". They are reunited once again in "A Problem Like Maria" when she asks for his assistance again to rescue a friend of hers. She is also revealed to be married, a secret she keeps from him until they share their goodbyes.
 Lennie James as Baptiste: An assassin employed by The Old Man who previously worked with Chance, being his partner, student and friend. Baptiste is one of the world's greatest assassins; amoral, ruthless, incredibly efficient and deadly, but he owes all his skills to being trained by Chance. Baptiste did not take it well when Chance ran away, and even now struggles to understand. Baptiste is responsible for countless deaths, including the flawless hits of heads of state. Most notably, Baptiste killed Katherine Walters and the previous Christopher Chance as seen in "Christopher Chance". Baptiste's plan to destroy Operation Olive Branch, a secret UN peace summit, was foiled by Chance and Agent Barnes, and so Baptiste was taken into custody by the FBI in "Baptiste". "The Return of Baptiste" shows that he was transferred to a Russian gulag. He betrayed Chance after being recruited to assist the team in retrieving hostages taken by Don Miguel Cervantes. Baptiste asks to become Cervantes' head contract killer, before betraying Cervantes to save Chance. On returning from the mission Baptiste vows never to return to the Russian gulag as promised, but he is outsmarted by Chance yet again.  He is also shown to collect his victims' watches.
 Armand Assante as The Old Man: The leader of an organization of professional mercenaries and assassins, his two favorite subordinates were Chance and Baptiste but, while he respects them both equally, he considered Chance his favorite and, becoming a surrogate father-figure to him, groomed him to be his successor, to the point he gave him his own name as Chance's - and when Chance ran and disappeared, taking the name "Christopher Chance", it was said to have "broken his heart". He seeks to re-recruit Chance back into his organization. His reputation for ruthlessness is so great Chance admitted the Old Man was the one person he is afraid of.
 Tony Hale as Harry:A private investigator who assists Chance and the team.

Production 
Fox announced in 2009 that Human Target would premiere mid-season. The show was filmed in Vancouver, British Columbia.

Human Target was renewed for a second season in May 2010. Matt Miller took over as showrunner from Jon E. Steinberg who remained part of the production team as an executive producer. Warner Bros. had contacted Miller to take a look at the first season and give his opinions on what changes he would make to the show.

The show was officially canceled on May 10, 2011.

Casting 
In the original concept, Jackie Earle Haley's character Guerrero was intended to have a one-time appearance in the pilot episode, and every episode thereafter would feature a different character assisting Chance and Winston. However, the producers liked Haley's performance and his character, and invited the actor to be a regular on the series.

Music 
Composer Bear McCreary scored the music for the first season, for which he received an Emmy Award nomination for Outstanding Main Title Theme Music. He wanted to create a modern classic-adventure score", and a heroic but still fun and iconic theme for Chance. Chance's theme later became the opening theme for the first season. McCreary wrote around 30 minutes of full orchestral music for 11 weeks in a row, which was performed by an average of 60 musicians. The score for the final episode of the season, "Christopher Chance", was performed by a total of 94 musicians, making it the largest live orchestra ever assembled for a television series. McCreary was not asked back for the second season as they could no longer afford a weekly 40-person orchestra. Chuck composer Tim Jones took over the role.

Broadcast 
The series premiered in Canada on CTV on January 15, 2010, and began airing on Fox two days later. The first three episodes aired in various time slots on Fox; it premiered on Sunday at 8:00 pm ET; the second episode aired Wednesday at 9:00 pm ET; and the third episode aired Tuesday at 9:00 pm ET before relocating to its regular time slot for the remainder of the season, Wednesday at 8:00 pm ET. The first seasons' finale aired April 11, 2010 in Canada and three days later in the U.S. The second season was due to premiere on September 24, 2010 but later delayed to October 1, airing in a new time slot, Fridays at 8:00 pm ET. Instead of airing the season premiere Fox aired a rerun of Human Target and moved the show back to Wednesdays, taking Lie to Me time-slot, which had moved to Mondays due to the cancellation of Lone Star. The second season premiered November 17, 2010 on Fox and originally aired Wednesdays at 8:00 pm ET. In January 2011, back-to-back episodes aired on January 5 and 14. Due to network coverage of the Tucson memorial service, the two scheduled episodes did not air in the United States on Fox, but they aired in Canada on A. The episodes were rescheduled and aired on January 14, 2011 on Fox. The next scheduled episode to air on January 26 was to be delayed and aired January 31, airing Monday at 8:00 pm ET. The final two episodes of the season aired on February 2 and 9, airing in another new timeslot, Wednesdays at 9:00 pm. Fox canceled the series on May 10, 2011.

In Australia, Human Target premiered on GO! on August 18, 2010. A week later it premiered in New Zealand on TV2.

In the UK, it premiered on Syfy on April 14, 2010. The second season was also broadcast on Syfy, and premiered on May 26, 2011.

Episodes

Season 1 (2010)

Season 2 (2010–11)

Home releases

DVD and Blu-ray 
Human Target – The Complete 1st Season was released as a widescreen three-disc region 1 DVD box set as well as a two-disc region free Blu-ray version on September 21, 2010. In addition to the 12 episodes of the season, which have an enhanced audio mix, a number of extras are included; several unaired and deleted scenes, an audio commentary by Mark Valley, Chi McBride, Jonathan E. Steinberg and Peter Johnson for the pilot episode and two featurettes; "Human Target: Full Contact Television" and "Human Target: Confidential Informant". The set received a rating of 4.5 out of 5 from Blu-ray.com, with concerns expressed that "squeezing twelve episodes onto two discs takes a bit of a toll" and caused some artifacting. The site also questioned the use of a lossy 640 kbit/s audio track and the small number of special features, calling it "a tad pricey for twelve episodes". By contrast, DVD Verdict said that the DVD's gave "a better-than average offering of supplements".

Soundtrack 
A two-disc soundtrack containing 43 tracks composed by Bear McCreary for the first season was released by WaterTower Music on October 8, 2010. A limited three-disc soundtrack with an additional 20 tracks was released on October 22 the same year by La-La Land Records.

Reception

Critical reception 
The series premiere of Human Target received generally favorable reviews, scoring 69 out of 100 on Metacritic based on 26 critical reviews. On Rotten Tomatoes, the season has an approval rating of 62% with an average rating of 6.8 out of 10 based on 29 reviews. The website's critics consensus states, "Human Target is frequently preposterous, but this slam-bang action series also offers a solid mix of comedy and thrills". The New York Post stated, "because he's a human target, he has no problem blowing out of exploding buildings (of which there are too many to count) with nary a scratch. Think Jack Bauer with excellent grooming". Robert Bianco wrote of the show's premiere in USA Today that the "confined-spaces fight on the train is a miniature marvel of its kind". Not all reviews were positive. Cynthia Fuchs gave the show a 3 out of 10, calling it predictable and the characters uninteresting.

The second-season premiere received similar favorable reviews, scoring slightly higher than the first season with 71 out of 100 on Metacritic based on 13 reviews. On Rotten Tomatoes, the season has an approval rating of 88% with an average rating of 7.2 out of 10 based on 24 reviews. The website's critics consensus states: "Action-packed sequences and the addition of two central female characters give Human Targets second season a necessary boost". Brian Lowry from Variety criticized the changes made to the second season believing that the producers were forced to give the show an overhaul by the network to make it more appealing to women. He believes the changes almost ruined the show for those who loved the first season, but he said "for all that, there are still some good moments in these early hours, and the stuntwork remains impressive". He was also happy to see the scheduling changes keeping the show away from the Friday night death slot. Some reviewers wondered what happened to the original theme music, with Ian Cullen going as far as to say that "the change of music in the opening title sequence just plain sucked".

Viewership 
In the U.S. the series premiere attracted 10.12 million viewers, and dropped to 7.24 million viewers for the season finale. The first season averaged on 8.26 million viewers and became 48th in viewers. In Canada the premiere was watched by 1.26 million people, ranking 21st in that week.

The second season continued the drop in viewers and premiered to 6.59 million viewers. Viewership increased for the final three episodes of the second season, when the show aired in special time slots. Notably, episode 12 which aired after American Idol, received 9.3 million viewers, a season-high, and the best ratings the series has had since the beginning of the first season.

Awards and nominations 
In 2010 Human Target was nominated for three Emmy Awards. Stunt coordinator Dean Choe received a nomination for "Outstanding Stunt Coordination" for the fifth episode "Run", Bear McCreary for "Outstanding Original Main Title Theme Music" and Karin Fong, Jeremy O. Cox and Cara McKenney for "Outstanding Main Title Design".

References

External links 

 

2010s American drama television series
2010 American television series debuts
2011 American television series endings
Fox Broadcasting Company original programming
American action television series
English-language television shows
Espionage television series
Television shows based on DC Comics
Television series by Warner Bros. Television Studios
Television shows set in San Francisco
Television series by Wonderland Sound and Vision
Works by Len Wein
Television shows filmed in Vancouver
Human Target